Juan Escobar may refer to:

 Juan Escobar (Paraguayan footballer) (born 1995)
 Juan Carlos Escobar (born 1982), Colombian footballer
 Juan Francisco Escobar (born 1949), Paraguayan football referee
 Juan M. Escobar, judge and politician in Texas